Cyclophora lyciscaria is a moth in the  family Geometridae. It is found in Guinea, Kenya, La Réunion, Madagascar and South Africa.

References

Moths described in 1858
Cyclophora (moth)
Moths of Africa
Moths of Madagascar
Moths of Réunion